Myrsine pearcei is a species of plant in the family Primulaceae. It is endemic to Peru.

References

pearcei
Endemic flora of Peru
Vulnerable plants
Trees of Peru
Taxonomy articles created by Polbot